Oumar Guindo (born 12 December 1969) is a Malian footballer. He played in four matches for the Mali national football team in 1994. He was also named in Mali's squad for the 1994 African Cup of Nations tournament.

References

External links
 

1969 births
Living people
Malian footballers
Mali international footballers
1994 African Cup of Nations players
Place of birth missing (living people)
Association footballers not categorized by position
21st-century Malian people
Women's national association football team managers